This is a list of awards and nominations received by South Korean actor Kim Soo-hyun.

Kim has won numerous accolades throughout the course of his career, including the Best Actor (TV) at 48th Baeksang Arts Awards for his acting in the historical drama series Moon Embracing the Sun.


Awards and nominations

Other accolades

State and cultural honors

Listicles

Notes

References 

Kim Soo-hyun